The Membertou Junior Miners are a Canadian Junior ice hockey club from Membertou, Nova Scotia.  They are members of the Nova Scotia Junior Hockey League and are 1989 and 1997 Don Johnson Cup Maritime Junior B champions and 1976 and 1977 Eastern League Junior A Champions.  The team was located in Sydney, Nova Scotia up until 2005.

History
First observed in the 1932-33 Cape Breton Junior Hockey League, the Sydney Millionaires (named after an earlier professional team) would win their league title in 1933, 1951, 1964, and 1965.  In the 1950s they dabbled with other names like the "Steel Kings" and the "Bombers" as their sponsors changed, but they always came back to the Millionaires.

In the 1970s, the Millionaires joined the Eastern Junior B Hockey League.  In 1975, the league became the Eastern Junior A Hockey League.  The Millionaires won the league in 1976 by defeating the Glace Bay Miners 4-games-to-1 and the New Waterford Jets 4-games-to-none in the final.  They moved on to the Eastern Canada Hewitt-Dudley Memorial Trophy semi-final where they lost 4-games-to-1 to the Island Junior Hockey League's Charlottetown Colonels.

The Millionaires repeated as champions in 1977 defeating the New Waterford Jets 4-games-to-none and then the Glace Bay Miners 4-games-to-2 in the final.  In the Eastern Canada Junior A quarter-final, the Millionaires defeated the Newfoundland Champion Corner Brook Jr. Royals 4-games-to-none.  In the semi-final, the Mills ran into PEI's Charlottetown Generals and were themselves swept 4-games-to-none from the playoffs.

In the 1980s, the Millionaires dropped down to Junior B in the Northumberland Junior B Hockey League.  They were league and Provincial Junior B Champions in 1988, 1989, and 1990.  In the 1989, at the Maritime Junior B Don Johnson Cup, the Millionaires would win their first Maritime Junior B Championship.  In 1992, their league merged with the Mainland Junior B Hockey League and Mills became the Cape Breton Jr. Mills.

In 1996, the Mills became the Cape Breton Alpines.  They would win the 1997 league title and move on to the Maritime Junior B Championship, the Don Johnson Cup, where they went undefeated, beating the New Brunswick Junior B Hockey League's Richibucto Bears 7-5, the Nova Scotia Junior Hockey League's Windsor Royals 5-4 in double overtime, and the Island Junior Hockey League's Sherwood-Parkdale Kings 8-4.  In the final, the Alpines faced Windsor again, clinching their second Maritime Jr. B Championship with a 5-2 win at their home rink.

They would win another league title in 2000, but lost the Don Johnson Cup final to New Brunswick's Woodstock Slammers 4-1.

In 2005, with a sponsorship from Molson Breweries, the team moved to Whitney Pier, Nova Scotia and became the Whitney Pier Canadians.  In 2007, they moved to Dominion, Nova Scotia and became the Cape Breton Canadians.

In the summer of 2010, the Canadians were moved to Glace Bay, Nova Scotia, Sydney's territorial rival, and renamed after their old nemesis the Glace Bay Jr. Miners. In 2016 they renamed themselves as the Kameron Jr. Moners and rebranded again in 2021 as Membertou Jr. Miners.

Season-by-season record

{|class="wikitable"
|- align="center"  bgcolor="#dddddd"
|Season	||GP || W || OTW/SOW || T/OTL || L || GF ||	GA || P || Results || Playoffs
|- align="center"
|2015-16  ||34    ||22   ||2    ||3   ||6    ||-   ||-    ||73  ||1st of 5 Sid Rowe1st of 11 NSJH'L    ||Won Div Semifinal, 4-0 (Blues)Won Div Final, 4-2 (Scotians)Lost League Finals, 0-4 (Maple Leafs)
|- align="center" bgcolor=red text_color = black
|colspan="12"|Kameron Jr. Miners
|- align="center"
|2016-17  ||34    ||21   ||1    ||5   ||7    ||149   ||94    ||70  ||1st of 5 Sid Rowe1st of 11 NSJH    ||Won Div Semifinal, 4-0 (Pirates)Lost Div. Finals, 3-4 (Scotians)
|- align="center"
|2017-18  ||34    ||26   ||-    ||2   ||6    ||157   ||93    ||54  ||1st of 5 Sid Rowe2nd of 11 NSJH    ||Won Div Semifinal, 4-0 (Pirates)Won Div. Finals, 4-1 (Bulldogs)Won League Finals 4-0 (Penguins)NSJHL League Champions
|- align="center"
|2018-19  ||32    ||20   ||-    ||5   ||7    ||170   ||108    ||45  ||2nd of 6 Sid Rowe4th of 12 NSJH    ||Won Div Semifinal, 4-1 (Scotians)Lost Div. Finals, 0-4 (Pirates)
|- align="center"
|2019-20  ||32    ||24   ||-    ||2   ||5    ||184   ||197    ||51  ||<small>1st of 12 NSJH</small>    ||Won Div Semifinal, 4-2 (Maple Leafs)remaining playoffs cancelled - covid
|- align="center"
|2020-21  ||5    ||3   ||-    ||2   ||0   ||26   ||11    ||51 8 ||colspan=2   |Season lost due to COVID-19 pandemic
|- align="center" bgcolor=red textcolor = white
|colspan="12"|Membertou Jr. Miners|- align="center"
|2021-22  ||19    ||11   ||-    ||3   ||5    ||81   ||58    ||25  ||3rd of 6 Sid Rowe4th of 12 NSJH    ||Won Div Quarterfinal, 3-0 (Blues)Won Div. Semiinals, 4-2 (Pirates)Lost Div. Finals, 2-4 (Bulldogs)
|}

Don Johnson Memorial CupEastern Canada Jr B Championships'''

External links
Jr. Miners Website

Ice hockey teams in Nova Scotia
Sport in the Cape Breton Regional Municipality